Sugar Ray is the fourth studio album by the band Sugar Ray. The album was released on June 12, 2001, and debuted at number 6 on the Billboard 200 chart, and went gold. The album's first single, "When It's Over", also performed well on pop and rock chartsming .

Release and promotion
The track "Words to Me" was featured on the Scooby-Doo film soundtrack in 2002. The movie was shot in Queensland, Australia, with the band themselves appearing in it. While in Australia, they performed a beach concert that would be later released on a DVD called Music in High Places: Live from Australia. The track "Sorry Now" was also featured in the 2001 film Scary Movie 2.

Reception and sales

Sugar Ray received generally positive reviews. Aggregator Metacritic gave the album a 71 out of 100 rating based on 10 reviews, indicating "generally favorable reviews".

The album sold one million copies, less than the multi-platinum albums Floored and 14:59, but far more than their next album, 2003's In the Pursuit of Leisure, which sold less than 150,000 copies.

Track listing

Personnel
 Mark McGrath – lead vocals, rhythm guitar 
 Rodney Sheppard – lead guitar, backing vocals
 Murphy Karges – bass, guitar, backing vocals 
 Stan Frazier – drums, percussion, guitar, programming, backing vocals 
 Craig "DJ Homicide" Bullock – turntables, samples, programming, keyboards, backing vocals

Additional personnel
 Emanuel Dean - Keyboards on "Ours"
 Dave Holdredge - Guitar on "Ours"
 Nick Hexum - Vocals on "Stay On"
 Greg Kurstin - Keyboards on "Words To Me"
 JayDee Maness - Pedal steel guitar on "Just a Little"
 William Francis - Guitar on "Disasterpiece"
 John "Juke" Logan - Harmonica on "Disasterpiece"

Charts

Weekly charts

Year-end charts

References

External links
 
 
 
 

2001 albums
Sugar Ray albums
Atlantic Records albums
Albums produced by David Kahne